Evening News may refer to:

Television news
CBS Evening News, an American news broadcast
ITV Evening News, a UK news broadcast
JNN Evening News, a Japanese news broadcast
Evening News, an alternate name for News Hour in some broadcasting regions

Newspapers

Australia
The Evening News (Rockhampton), an evening newspaper published in Rockhampton, Queensland, Australia
The Evening News (Sydney), an evening newspaper published in Sydney, New South Wales from 1867 to 1931

China
Xinmin Evening News, a newspaper published in Shanghai, China
Yanzhao Evening News, a tabloid newspaper published in Shijiazhuang, Hebei Province, China

United Kingdom
Evening News (London), an evening newspaper published in London from 1881 to 1980, when it merged with the Evening Standard
Cambridge Evening News, a daily newspaper published in Cambridge, England
Edinburgh Evening News, a newspaper based in Edinburgh, Scotland
London Evening News, a newspaper that was first published in 1855 in London, England
Manchester Evening News, a daily newspaper published in Manchester, England
Norwich Evening News, a daily newspaper published in Norwich, Norfolk, England
Worcester News, a tabloid newspaper known as the Worcester Evening News until 2005, based in Worcester, England

United States
listed alphabetically by state
The Evening News (San Jose), a newspaper from 1886 until 1927 in San Jose, California
The Evening News (Jeffersonville), a daily newspaper serving Jeffersonville and Clark County, Indiana
The Evening News (Newburgh), a former U.S. newspaper published in Newburgh, New York
 Fall River Daily Evening News, previously published in Fall River, Massachusetts
Southbridge Evening News, a daily newspaper in Southbridge, Massachusetts
The Evening News (Sault Ste. Marie), a local newspaper in Sault Ste. Marie, Michigan
The Evening News, a newspaper that became part of The Patriot-News in Harrisburg, Pennsylvania
The Evening News (Providence), a daily newspaper serving Providence, Rhode Island

Other uses
"The Evening News" (Chamillionaire song), a song from the album Ultimate Victory
The Evening News (novel), a 1990 novel by Arthur Hailey

"The Evening News" (song), a 2007 song by rapper Chamillionaire from the album, Ultimate Victory
The Evening News (short story collection), 1986 book by Tony Ardizzone